Onondaga Creek is a major tributary of Onondaga Lake which is located in Onondaga County, New York. The creek flows north through the Tully Valley and through the city of Syracuse where it empties into Onondaga Lake.

The major tributaries of Onondaga Creek are the West Branch of Onondaga Creek, Hemlock Creek and Rattlesnake Gulf.

History

In the late 1940s, the Army Corps of Engineers built a flood control dam and reservoir within the Onondaga Nation Reservation for the purpose of regulating the peak flow that reaches the city of Syracuse. The structure influences the creek's flow pattern only in the event of a large runoff when a portion of very high flow is stored in the reservoir and later released back into the creek when the water recedes.

See also 
 List of rivers of New York
 Onondaga Creekwalk

References

External links 
 

Rivers of Onondaga County, New York
Geography of Syracuse, New York
Rivers of New York (state)
Onondaga Lake